Ukanaskneli Gmiri (Georg.უკანასკნელი გმირი)/(Eng. The Last Hero) is the Georgian version of the popular show Survivor. The show only ran for one season that lasted from October 6, 2007 to January 7, 2008. Throughout the season the contestants were broken up into two tribes the blue tribe and the yellow tribe. The twists for this season began in episode one when, immediately following the initial reward challenge, the losing blue tribe was forced to vote someone out on the spot. During the pre-tribe stage, the blue tribe was over powered in the challenges by the yellow tribe losing every immunity challenge. When it came time to merge the surviving members of the blue tribe were not immediately pick off as the yellow tribe's members turned against each other. When only seven competitors remained they competed in an elimination challenge in which one player was eliminated for cheating and another for coming in last. Eventually, it was blue tribe survivor Tamar Chanturashvili who won the season over Zviad by a public vote of 81%.

Finishing order

Voting history

 At the tenth tribal council voting was optional.

External links
 http://worldofbigbrother.com/Survivor/Geo/1/about.shtml

Survivor (franchise)
2007 Georgia (country) television series debuts
2008 Georgia (country) television series endings
Georgia (country) television series
2000s Georgia (country) television series
Rustavi 2 original programming